The Historic Core is a district within Downtown Los Angeles includes the world's largest concentration of movie palaces, former large department stores, and office towers, all built chiefly between 1907 and 1931. Within it lie the Broadway Theater District and the Spring Street historic financial district, and in its west it overlaps with the Jewelry District and in its east with Skid Row.

The Historic Core falls into two business improvement districts, Historic Core (south of 4th St.) and Downtown LA (from 2nd to 4th Street). The total Historic Core is thus composed of:
Los Angeles Street from 2nd to 6th streets, 
Spring Street and Main Street from 2nd to 7th streets, 
Broadway from 2nd to 9th streets,
Hill Street from 2nd to 10th streets

Please consult the articles about the individual streets and historic districts above for a full discussion of the architectural landmarks in the district.

History

The Historic Core was the central business district of the city from the first decade of the 1900s through the 1950s. Before 1900 the business center was further north, between the Plaza and about Third Street. Starting in the 1950s what is now the Historic Core started to decline. Upscale shopping had moved west to the Seventh & Hope area starting in the 1920s, and to Mid-Wilshire by the 1930s. When consumers lived and worked near the prolific streetcar lines, it was relatively easy for them to reach downtown, the hub of both the Los Angeles Railway and Pacific Electric systems. Now, an ever increasing number of consumers had cars, lived further away from downtown, and due to the proliferation of suburban retail, were able to shop, dine, and go to the movies there without worries about downtown parking and traffic congestion. In addition, after World War II,  financial institutions moved several blocks to the west, ending up on Figueroa Street, Flower Street, and Grand Avenue. In the 1950s the Historic Core became the center of Latino retail and entertainment in the city, e.g.: the Million Dollar Theatre featured the biggest names in the Spanish language entertainment world. This paralleled the general white flight occurring in Central Los Angeles at the time, which saw Broadway become a major center for Latino life in the city.

Although prostitution and drug dealing had occurred in the area as far back as the early 1920s, they became epidemic in the 1960s. The area's movie palaces, built between 1911 and 1931, became grindhouses. The last of them closed in the 1990s; the Orpheum Theatre recently underwent a complete restoration at a cost of several million dollars, and is now used for major movie premieres (such as "Collateral" in 2005), celebrity events (Michael Jackson's birthday party), comedy shows (Bill Burr), fashion shows, concerts (Opeth), and plays. Most of the older buildings have stores that cater to the Latino immigrant working class.

The developing street gang problem in Los Angeles which began to worsen at the end of the 1960s and got considerably worse in the late 1970s, also hurt traditional commercial activity in the area, as it did much of downtown. While the LAPD indicates that the area is a sort of neutral zone, which has not been claimed by any single gang and random gang violence is rare, the area remains one of the major areas for street drug sales in Los Angeles.

Redevelopment

In 1999, the Los Angeles City Council passed an Adaptive Re-Use Ordinance, allowing for the conversion of old, unused office buildings to apartments or "lofts." Developer Tom Gilmore purchased a series of century-old buildings and converted them into lofts near Main and Spring streets, a development now known as the "Old Bank District."  Other notable redevelopment projects in the Historic Core have included the Eastern Columbia Building, Broadway Trade Center, Higgins Building, The Security Building, the Pacific Electric Building, The Judson, and the Subway Terminal Building.  As of 2005, redevelopment projects in downtown Los Angeles have been divided about evenly between rentals and condominiums; though projects near the Staples Center arena in the South Park neighborhood have been overwhelmingly dedicated to condominiums.

Map of landmarks

See also

Within Downtown Los Angeles
 Broadway (Los Angeles) 
 Broadway Theater District
 Central Business District, Los Angeles (1880-1899)
 Old Bank District
 Spring Street Financial District

References

External links

Historic Core Business Improvement District

Districts of Downtown Los Angeles